Sitecore is a customer experience management company that provides web content management, and multichannel marketing automation software. The company was founded in 2001 in Denmark.

Origins
In 1998, in Copenhagen, Denmark, University of Copenhagen alumni Thomas Albert, Jakob Christensen, Peter Christensen, Ole Sas Thrane, and Michael Seifert founded Pentia A/S, a systems integration company that focused on implementing websites built on Microsoft technologies. At the time, building and managing websites required the expertise of a programmer or developer. Thrane and Christensen devised and patented a set of procedures for building and managing websites and turned their invention into a content management system product.

In 2001, Sitecore was spun off as a separate business entity that initially sold content management systems in the Danish market. However, the company has grown into a global provider of customer experience management software targeted primarily to corporate marketing departments and marketing service providers.

Acquisitions
In July 2011, Sitecore acquired the development team and the intellectual property of Pectora, a provider of web publishing solutions for deep integration with print-based projects.

In November 2013, Sitecore acquired the assets of commerceserver.net from Smith (formerly Ascentium) and took responsibility and ownership for developing, marketing, and selling Sitecore Commerce Server, formerly a Microsoft product called Microsoft Commerce Server.

In July 2014, Sitecore acquired a majority stake in Komfo, a Danish social media marketing and community engagement application provider and introduced its social media marketing suite, Sitecore Social.

In 2015, a portion of Sitecore's operations moved to Marina Plaza in Sausalito, California.

In October 2018, Sitecore announced acquisition of Stylelabs, a marketing technologies software vendor, and stated its intent to incorporate Stylelabs' digital asset management, marketing resource management and product information management applications into its Experience Cloud; the acquisition was completed in November 2018.

In June 2019, Sitecore acquired Hedgehog, a digital consultancy.

In March 2021, Sitecore acquired Boxever and Four51. Boxever is a SaaS-based Customer Data Platform (CDP) providing decisioning and experimentation. Four51 is a company delivering modern B2B and B2C experiences for enterprise brands. 

In May 2021, Sitecore acquired Moosend. Moosend is a marketing automation platform. 

In September 2021, Sitecore acquired Reflektion. Reflektion is an AI-powered digital search platform.

Leadership
Michael Seifert was the company's CEO from its founding in 2001 until 2017. His method for collecting human experience analytics data was awarded US Patent 8,255,526 in August 2012.

References

Content management systems
Information technology companies of Denmark
Software companies based in Copenhagen
Danish companies established in 2001